Caladenia longiclavata, commonly known as the clubbed spider orchid is a species of plant in the orchid family, Orchidaceae and is endemic to the south-west of Western Australia. It is a widespread and common orchid with a single, hairy leaf and one or two greenish-yellow, white and red flowers and which grows in the area between Perth and Albany.

Description 
The petals are slightly shorter and narrower than the sepals and curve stiffly downwards. Flowering occurs from September to early November.

Taxonomy and naming 
Caladenia longiclavata was first described in 1930 by Edith Coleman and the description was published in The Victorian Naturalist. The specific epithet (longiclavata) is derived from the Latin words longus meaning "long" and clavus meaning "club" or "cudgel" referring to the club-like tips of the sepals and petals.

Distribution and habitat 
The clubbed spider orchid is common and widespread between Perth and Albany in the Avon Wheatbelt, Esperance Plains, Jarrah Forest, Swan Coastal Plain and Warren biogeographic regions where it grows in woodland and forests.

Conservation 
Caladenia longiclavata is classified as "not threatened" by the Western Australian Government Department of Parks and Wildlife.

References 

longiclavata
Orchids of Western Australia
Endemic orchids of Australia
Plants described in 1933
Endemic flora of Western Australia